«Parem» is a Tajik folk-rock band, formed in 1993, based on the vocal instrumental ensemble «Boychechak», at the House of Pioneers of Frunzensky district of Dushanbe city.

History 
The «Parem» band was formed in March 1993 by Vladimir Yumatov, Olim Shirinov, Feyruz Hakimov and Alisher Zarikov. The name of the band was given by Olim Shirinov, who suggested that the group be called "Parem", during the discussion of various options for the name of the group.The first composition of the band was consisted of:
 Vladimir Yumatov - vocals, drums 
 Olim Shirinov - vocals, bass guitar 
 Feyruz Hakimov - vocals, rhythm guitar 
 Alisher Zarikov - lead guitar 
 Vladislav Nechipurenko - keyboards 
 Nargis Muminova - vocals

The band «Parem» gave their first concerts in the midst of the Civil War in Tajikistan. These were home concerts and performances at schools and small clubs in the city of Dushanbe.

In May 1993, Olim Shirinov left the band due to a conflict with Vladimir Yumatov and leaded the beat band «Kamchatka», Maksud Tairov took the place of bass guitar player, an old friend of the band who had played in «Boychechak».

In June 1993, Feyruz Hakimov and Vladislav Nechipurenko left «Parem» and at the suggestion of Olim Shirinov joined the «Kamchatka» band. Alisher Sayfulloev took the place of Feyruz Hakimov in the band «Parem».

From the spring of 1993 to 1995, the band «Parem» periodically performed at “Rock Panoramas”, performing songs in Russian that were sung by Vladimir Yumatov.

In 1994, Nargis Muminova left the band. She lives in Germany now.

1995 became a turning point for the future of the band, the first songs in the Tajik language began to appear in the «Parem»'s repertoire, that Alisher Sayfulloev began to compose and sing.

In early 1995, Vladimir Yumatov left the band, and Olim Shirinov, who returned to the band, took his place as a leader and music producer. The band radically changes the style, abandoning the use of keyboards and choosing rock and roll and folk-rock as the main style.

In the spring of 1995, Sobir Aminov joined the band as rhythm guitarist.
 

In May 1996, the band «Parem» recorded their first album - «Why Love».

The following took part in the recording of the album: 
Band «Parem»:
 Alisher Sayfulloev - vocals, rhythm guitar 
 Olim Shirinov - vocals, drums, clave, music producer 
 Alisher Zarikov - lead guitar 
 Maksud Tairov - bass guitar 
 Sobir Aminov - rhythm guitar

Recording staff: 
 Zurab Kokoev  — sound engineer
 Vladimir Yumatov - programming drum parts

In addition to the original songs of the band «Parem», the album included 2 songs of «The Beatles» - Things We Said Today and The Long and Winding Road. The songs of «The Beatles» have been an integral part of all the performances of the band «Parem» since its formation, for which the musicians are often called as «Dushanbe Beatles».

The presentation of the album took place on 15 June 1996 at the Russian Drama Theater named by V. Mayakovsky.

In 1996, Maksud Tairov left the band, moving to Uzbekistan for permanent residence and Sobir Aminov became the bass-guitar player of the band.

1997, the band «Parem» recorded the song «Medoni yo ne». The song quickly became popular among youth and students. According to the fans of the band «Medoni yo ne» is the visit card of the band «Parem».

In December 1998, Alisher Sayfulloev left the band. Khakimjon Khazratkulov took his place as a rhythm guitarist, and Sobir Aminov becomes the main singer of the band «Parem».

At the end of 1999, the band's second album, «Dishab», was released. All songs on this album were written by Sobir Aminov.

The album «Dishab» was recorded at the State Studio «Radio House» of the Republic of Tajikistan in the following composition:

 Sobir Aminov - vocals, bass guitar 
 Olim Shirinov - drums, backing vocals, music producer 
 Alisher Zarikov - lead guitar 
 Khakimjon Khazratkulov - rhythm guitar

Session Musician:
 Zarif Pulodov — percussion
Sound engineer: 
Vladimir Shlykov
The presentation of the album «Dishab» took place on 4 and 5 December 1999 on the stage of the Cinema-Concert Hall named by Borbad.

In 2000, very young Daler Sultonov joined the band, first as a percussionist, and then as a guitarist and vocalist.

In September 2001, the «Parem» band together with the «Farzin» band leaves for Germany, where the musicians gave a joint concert in the city of Giessen.

In 2004, the percussionist Farrukh Khudoyberdyev joined the band.

On 24 July 2011, «Parem» made a first performance in Moscow city, on the stage of the capital club .

The day after the concert, the anchorpersons of the morning show of the state radio station Mayak – “Stillavin and his friends” - Sergei Stillavin and Rustam Vakhidov, having criticized the performance of the «Parem» band, moved from discussing the band's repertoire to direct insults on ethnic grounds, which caused a great resonance in the Russian, Tajik and European press.

On August 24, 2011, the hosts of Mayak radio, Sergei Stillavin and Rustam Vakhidov, apologized to the «Parem» group.

In 2012, Farrukh Khudoyberdyev left the band and was replaced by percussionist Shavkat Mullodzhonov, who mainly plays the doira.

In September 2012, the «Parem» band again had a tour to the Russian Federation, where they held series of concerts in Moscow and the Moscow region.

On Monday, 29 April 2013, in the city clinical hospital of Dushanbe, after a short illness, Khakimjon Khazratkulov the guitarist of the «Parem» band died. In July 2013, the attending physician of Khakimjon Khazratkulov was taken into custody.

In the summer of 2013, Khakim's place in the band was taken by Sulton Imomov, who had previously played in the “Shabdez” band.

On June 6, 2022, Alisher Zarikov decided to leave Parem, the group informed fans about this on their Facebook and Instagram pages.

In June 2022, Feyruz Hakimov becomes the solo guitarist of the «Parem» group.

Members

Current members 
 Olim Shirinov - drums, vocals, music producer 
 Sobir Aminov - bass guitar, vocals, guitar
 Feyruz Hakimov — lead guitar, stringed instruments
 Shavkat Mullojonov - doira

Former members 
 Nargis Muminova — vocals (1993-1994); 
 Vladislav Nechipurenko — keyboards (1993); 
 Vladimir Youmatov — drums, vocal (1993-1995);
 Maksud Tairov — bass guitar (1993-1996);
 Nodir Sharipov — tavlak (1996-1998); 
 Evgeny Tengizbaev — clarinet (1997-1998); 
 Alisher Sayfulloev — vocals, guitar (1994-1998), (2007-2014); 
 Farrukh Khudoyberdyev — percussion (2005-2012); 
 Khakimjon Khazratkulov — rhythm guitar, acoustic guitar (1999-2013); 
 Sulton Imomov — rhythm guitar (2013-2017); 
 Daler Sultonov — percussion, tabla (2001-2005), guitar, acoustic guitar, vocals, guitar (2013-2019);
 Alisher Zarikov - lead guitar, guitar.

Timeline

Awards 
 On 31 January 1998, the «Parem» band became a Diploma-recipient of the «SONE» Prize, established by the «MIR» TV and Radio Broadcasting Company, in the nomination of «Best Debut of the Year».
 On 19 December 1999, the «Parem» band became an awardee of the competition «Melodies of the Past Century» organized by the «Open Society» Institute - Assistance Foundation, in the nomination «Nostalgia».
 On 15 May 2004, the band «Parem» with the song «Tanho dar yod» became an awardee of the competition «Song of the Year 2004», organized by the TV and Radio Broadcasting Company «Asia-Plus».
 On 21 May 2005, the band «Parem» with the song «Ay gulak» became an awardee of the competition «Song of the Year 2005», organized by the TV and Radio Broadcasting Company «Asia-Plus».
 In 2016, the band «Parem» with the song «Alo Gul» became an awardee of the competition «Song of the Year 2016», organized by the Holding Company “Orieno-Media» with the support of the Ministry of Culture of the Republic of Tajikistan.
 On 21 December 2021, the band «Parem» with the song «Oshiqi zoram» became an awardee of the competition «Tarona Music Award 2021», organized by the TV and Radio Broadcasting Company «Asia-Plus».

Albums

Singles

Links 
 ISNI ID «Parem»
 Official Youtube channel of the «Parem» group
 The official Instagram channel of the «Parem» group
 «Parem» Page on Apple Music
 «Parem» Page on Yandex Music
 Link to the archive page of the old official site of the «Parem» group (Wikipedia Archive)

References

Tajikistani musical groups